Bordeira is a semicircular mountain in the middle of the island Fogo. It is a crater rim, up to 1 km high, formed by a prehistoric collapse of the volcano Pico do Fogo. The name literally means the "border". It forms part of Fogo Natural Park. Opening to the east, it effectively protects the northern, western and southern part of the island against lava flows from the volcano. The settlement Chã das Caldeiras lies at the foot of Bordeira, in the caldera. The east side of the Bordeira cliff is much steeper than the west side.

See also
List of mountains in Cape Verde

References

External links

Bordeira
Bordeira